Vitis arizonica is a North American species of wild grape. It is a deciduous vine.

Common names for the grape are Arizona grape, canyon grape, and uva del monte.

Etymology
Vitis is Latin for "vine", while arizonica means "of or from Arizona".

Distribution
Arizona grape is found in California (Inyo County), Arizona, Nevada, New Mexico, western Texas, southern Utah, Sonora, Chihuahua, Coahuila, Durango, and Tamaulipas. Within Arizona, Vitis arizonica is found in all counties, except La Paz.

Morphology
Form: Vine General: Woody vine, sprawling or weakly climbing; stems generally 2–6 m long; the young twigs densely woolly, but losing this over time and the bark becoming shreddy. Leaves: Winter deciduous; broadly cordate, 3–10 cm long and about as wide, irregularly toothed and sometimes shallowly 3-lobed, more-or-less cottony hairy; petiole 1–3 cm long; tendrils opposite the leaves, bifurcate, lacking adhesive discs, withering quickly if not attached to something. Flowers: Inflorescence a loose, open, strongly branched panicle, 2–10 cm long, emerging opposite the leaves; flowers tiny with five, white petals. Fruits: Edible (but sometimes bitter) grapes, 8–10 mm thick, black.

The Arizona grape is a vigorously branching vine. Stems are slender, with significant tapering from base to apex. Fully developed leaves resemble a three-lobed heart shape and generally grow to an average of 4 inches long/wide. Leaves exhibit irregular toothed edge. Green flower buds develop in clusters, and small flowers bloom in a whitish green hue. Globe or ovate shaped fruit are typically 1/3-3/8 in diameter; immature fruit is green in color, developing into a deep purple or black. Fruit are clustered on red pedicels.

Uses
Vitis arizonica has been used in breeding varieties resistant to Pierce's Disease.
Arizona grape is edible with different individual plants being sweet and others being bitter. The fruit can be used for wine making, jams, but is mainly consumed by wildlife.

Gallery

References

External links
USDA Plants Profile for Vitis arizonica (canyon grape)

arizonica
Flora of Arizona
Flora of New Mexico
Flora of Sonora
Flora of Tamaulipas
Flora of Texas
Flora of Utah
Fruits originating in North America
Plants described in 1868
Plants used in Native American cuisine
Bird food plants
Vines
Flora without expected TNC conservation status